Africans in Hong Kong constitute a small number of total residents in Hong Kong.

Population
There were 3,144 Africans living in Hong Kong in 2016 according to the Africa Center Hong Kong, 2,012 male and 1,132 females. This includes migrants from Southern Africa, who number around 200 residents and consist mainly of Africans of European origin.

Africans began settling in Hong Kong in the 1990s, arrivals typically being businessmen coming to Hong Kong to engage in trading activities, or to make deals with Mainland China through a middleman. Many stayed, resulting in the majority of people of African descent currently residing in Hong Kong.

About half of the Africans in Hong Kong live in Yuen Long, with another concentration in Chungking Mansions in Kowloon's Tsim Sha Tsui district. Some notable Africans in Hong Kong includes Innocent Mutanga, an investment banker with Goldman Sachs who came to Hong Kong with only 200 HKD and worked his way up from being homeless to becoming one of the elites in Hong Kong and also runs the Africa Center Hong Kong. Historically, many Africans in Hong Kong were traders, dealing in mobile phones and electronic devices for export markets at shops in Chungking Mansions, but this is quickly changing as Africans choose Guangzhou's Xiaobei for this business.

There were 492 complaints of racial discrimination against them from 2015 to 2020.

See also
Africans in Guangzhou
Nigerians in China

References

African diaspora in Hong Kong
Ethnic groups in Hong Kong
 
African diaspora in Asia
African diaspora in China